South Africa women's national softball team is the national team for South Africa administered by Softball South Africa. The team competed at the 1998 ISF Women's World Championship in Fujinomiya City, Japan where they finished fifteenth. The team competed at the 2002 ISF Women's World Championship in Saskatoon, Saskatchewan where they finished fourteenth.  The team competed at the 2006 ISF Women's World Championship in Beijing, China where they finished fifteenth. The team competed at the 2010 ISF Women's World Championship in Caracas, Venezuela where they finished fifteenth.

References

External links 
 International Softball Federation

Softball
Women's national softball teams
Softball in South Africa